"Blue and Yellow" is the third single from the Used's self-titled debut album The Used. It was released to radio on May 20, 2003 and a music video was released around the same time. This song is about the friendship between Bert and Quinn.

Music video
The music video was not filmed at a video shoot but instead is a compilation of video clips of the band over the previous 2 years.  It starts with the band playing in a small room. It transfers between Bert singing in a blue room and clips of the band live and touring. The video is included on the Maybe Memories DVD.

Track listing
US promotional single
 "Blue and Yellow" (Album Version) – 3:21

Personnel 
 John Feldmann – engineer, mixed by, producer

Charts

Release history

Notes

The Used songs
2003 singles
2002 songs
Reprise Records singles
Songs written by Quinn Allman
Songs written by Jeph Howard
Song recordings produced by John Feldmann
Songs written by Bert McCracken
Songs written by Branden Steineckert